Gridiron Classic may refer to one of two American football post-season games:

 Gridiron Classic (1999–2005), an all-star game held in Florida
 Gridiron Classic (2006–2009), an FCS bowl game between champions of the Northeast Conference and Pioneer Football League

See also
 Dixie Gridiron Classic
 Magnolia Gridiron All-Star Classic